Herbert A. Werner (13 May 1920 – 6 April 2013) was a German submarine officer and captain during World War II. Werner moved to the United States in 1957 and became an American citizen.

Biography
Herbert Werner was born in Freiburg im Breisgau in 1920. He joined the navy in 1939 as an officer candidate and became a midshipman (Fähnrich zur See) in November 1940. in April 1941 he was appointed watch officer on  under Ottokar Paulshen and carried out three war patrols with her, from April to November 1941, during which he was involved in a number of engagements and took part in the sinking of five merchant ships.

Werner was promoted and sent to U-boat school for training, before joining U-612 in April 1942 as first watch officer under Paul Siegmann. Werner accomplished four patrols with her (seeing only one success) up to December 1943, when he was again promoted and sent to commanders school.

In April 1944 he took command of U-415 but made only two abortive sorties before she was sunk in harbour after detonating a mine.

Werner is thought to have moved to the US in 1957, and there wrote the best selling memoir Iron Coffins. He is believed to have died on 4 (or 6) April 2013 in Vero Beach, Florida.

References

Sources

 
 

1920 births
2013 deaths
U-boat commanders (Kriegsmarine)
Soldiers of the French Foreign Legion
Military personnel from Freiburg im Breisgau
People from the Republic of Baden
German emigrants to the United States